Edward Skinner may refer to

 Edward Skinner (architect) (1869–1910), British architect who practiced in Ceylon
 Edward Skinner (cricketer) (1847–1919), English first-class cricketer

See also

 Edward Skinner King (1861–1931), American astronomer